Mah-e Asal or Māh-e Asal is the Iranian honeymoon, and may refer to:
 Mah-e Asal (TV series)
 Mah-e Asal (1976 film) by Fereydun Gole
 Mah-e Asal (1978 book) by Gholam-Hossein Sa'edi